This is a partial list of artists active in Britain, arranged chronologically (artists born in the same year should be arranged alphabetically within that year).

Born before 1700
 
 Hans Holbein the Younger (1497/8–1543) – German artist and printmaker who became court painter in England
 Marcus Gheeraerts the Elder (c. 1520 – c. 1590) – Flemish printmaker and painter for the English court of the mid-16th century
 George Gower (1540–1596) – English portrait painter
 Nicholas Hilliard (1547–1619) – English goldsmith, limner, portrait miniature painter
 Rowland Lockey (c. 1565 – 1616) – English goldsmith, portrait miniaturist, painter
 Isaac Oliver (c. 1565 – 1617) – French-born English portrait miniature painter
 Anthony van Dyck (1599–1641) – Flemish Baroque painter, watercolourist and etcher who became court painter in England
 Wenceslaus Hollar (1607–1677) – Czech etcher
 Samuel Cooper (c. 1608 – 1672) – English miniature painter
 John Michael Wright (1617–1694) – British baroque portrait painter
 Peter Lely (1618–1680) – Dutch painter and portrait artist in England
 Francis Barlow (c. 1626 – 1704) – English painter, etcher, and illustrator
 David Loggan (1635–1692) – English baroque painter, born in Danzig
 Godfrey Kneller (1646/9–1723) – portrait painter in England
 Edward Pierce (1630–1695)
 Francis Place (1647–1728) – English potter and engraver
 James Thornhill (1675–1734) –  English painter of historical subjects
 Jonathan Richardson (1665–1745) – English portrait painter
 Peter Monamy (1681–1749) – English marine painter
 John Wootton (1682–1764) – English painter of sporting subjects, battle scenes and landscapes
 Pieter Andreas Rysbrack (1685 or 1690–1748) – Flemish painter working in London
 John Michael Rysbrack (1694–1770) – Flemish sculptor working in London
 John Vanderbank (1694–1739) – English portrait painter and book illustrator
 William Hogarth (1697–1764) – English painter, printmaker, pictorial satirist, social critic and editorial cartoonist

Born 1700–1799

Henri Jean-Baptiste Victoire Fradelle (1778–1865) – Franco-English painter specializing in literary, historical and religious subjects.
 Louis-François Roubiliac (1702/5–1762) – French sculptor whose works reside in Westminster Abbey
 Samuel Scott (1702–1770) – British landscape painter
 James Seymour (c. 1702 – 1752) – English painter especially of equestrian art
 William Hoare (c. 1707 – 1792) – English painter especially of pastels
 Francis Hayman (1708–1776) – English painter, illustrator, and one of the founding members of the Royal Academy
 Arthur Devis (c. 1712 – 1787) – English portrait painter, especially of conversation pieces and other small portraits
 Allan Ramsay (1713–1784) – Scottish portrait painter
 Richard Wilson 	(1713–1782) – Welsh landscape painter and one of the founder members of the Royal Academy
 Alexander Cozens (c. 1717 – 1786) – British landscape painter in watercolours and a published teacher of painting
 Charles Brooking (1723–1759) – English painter
 Joshua Reynolds (1723–1792) – English painter specialising in portraits
 George Stubbs (1724–1806) – British painter especially of horses
 Francis Cotes (1726–1770) – English painter
 Thomas Gainsborough (1727–1788) – English portrait and landscape painter
 Paul Sandby (1730–1809) – English map-maker turned landscape painter in watercolours
 Sawrey Gilpin (1733–1807) – English animal painter
 Johann Zoffany (1733–1810) – German neoclassical painter, active mainly in England
 George Romney (1734–1802) – English portrait painter
 Joseph Wright (1734–1797) – English landscape and portrait painter
 Alexander Runciman (1736–1785) – Scottish painter of historical and mythological subjects
 Mary Black (c.1737–1814) – English portrait painter 
 Joseph Nollekens (1737–1823) – sculptor from London
 Francis Towne (1739/40–1816) – English watercolour painter
 Angelica Kauffman (1740–1807) – Swiss-Austrian painter
 Philip James de Loutherbourg (1740–1812) – English artist of French origin
 William Marlow (1740–1813) – English landscape and marine artist
 John Hamilton Mortimer (1740–1779) – British Neoclassical painter especially of romantic paintings
 Matthew William Peters (1742–1814) English portrait painter
 James Barry (1741–1806) – Irish painter
 Henry Fuseli (1741–1825) – British painter, draughtsman, and writer on art, of German-Swiss origin
 Richard Cosway (1742–1821) – English portrait painter, miniaturist
 Ozias Humphry (1742–1810) – English painter of portrait miniatures
 John Robert Cozens (1752–1797) – English draftsman and painter of romantic watercolor landscapes
 Thomas Bewick (1753–1828) – English wood engraver and ornithologist
 Thomas Stothard (1755–1834 – English painter and engraver
 Prince Hoare (1755–1834) – painter and dramatist
 Henry Raeburn (1756–1823) – Scottish portrait painter
 Thomas Rowlandson (1756–1827) – English artist and caricaturist
 William Blake (1757–1827) – English poet, painter, and printmaker
 Alexander Nasmyth (1758–1840) – Scottish portrait and landscape painter
 Lemuel Francis Abbott (1760–1803) – English portrait painter
 Thomas Lawrence (1760–1830) – English painter, mostly of portraits
 Charles Fairfield (1761?–1805) – English painter, mostly known as a copyist
 John Charles Felix Rossi (1762–1839) – sculptor
 Arthur William Devis (1762–1822) – English painter of history paintings and portraits
 George Morland (1763–1804) – English painter of animals and rustic scenes
 Joshua Cristall (1767–1847) – Cornish watercolour painter
 John Crome (1768–1821) – English artist, founder of the Norwich school of painters
 James Ward (1769–1859) – English painter, particularly of animals, and an engraver
 Thomas Phillips (1770–1845) – English portrait and subject painter
 Henry James Richter (1772–1857) – engraver and painter
 François Hüet Villiers (1772–1813) – French-born portrait painter, resident in London 
 Anne Frances Byrne (1775–1837) – painter of flowers and still lifes
 Thomas Girtin (1775–1802) – English painter, watercolourist, and etcher
 Sir John Dean Paul, 1st Baronet (1775–1852) – painter of landscapes and horses
 J. M. W. Turner (1775–1851) – English Romantic landscape painter, watercolourist and printmaker
 John Constable (1776–1837) – English Romantic painter
 John Higton (1776–1827) – English painter, particularly of animals, and an engraver
 Maria Spilsbury (1776–1820) – painter of religious subjects
 John Masey Wright (1777–1866) – watercolour painter
 John Varley (1778–1842) – English watercolour painter and astrologer
 Augustus Wall Callcott (1779–1844) – English landscape painter
 Samuel Colman (1780–1845) – English painter
 James Holworthy (1781–1841) – watercolour painter
 John Sell Cotman (1782–1842) – artist of the Norwich school, mainly in watercolour
 Frederick Nash (painter) (1782–1856) – architectural and landscape painter
 David Cox (1783–1859) – English landscape painter
 Samuel Prout (1783–1852) – English watercolour painter
 Peter De Wint (1784–1849) – English landscape painter
 John Romney (1785–1863) – mainly printmaking and watercolour
 David Wilkie (1785–1841) – Scottish painter
 William Mulready (1786–1863) – Irish genre painter living in London
 Benjamin Haydon (1786–1846) – English historical painter and writer
 Patrick Nasmyth (1787–1831) – Scottish landscape painter
 John Martin (1789–1854) – English painter
 William Henry Hunt (1790–1864) – English watercolor painter
 George Hayter (1792–1871) English painter, specialising in portraits
 John Linnell (1792–1882) – English landscape painter
 Francis Danby (1793–1861) – Irish painter
 Edward Calvert (1799–1883) – English printmaker and painter
 James Holland (1799–1870) – landscape painter and illustrator
 Eglington Margaret Pearson (died 1823) – stained glass painter

Born 1800–1899

Richard Parkes Bonington (1802–1828) – English Romantic landscape painter
 Edwin Henry Landseer (1802–1873) – English painter and sculptor especially of animals, particularly horses, dogs and stags
 Thomas Shotter Boys (1803–1874) – English watercolor painter
 Thomas Sidney Cooper (1803–1902) – English painter especially of cattle and farm animals
 John Steell (1804–1891) – Scottish sculptor
 John Frederick Lewis (1804–1876) – Orientalist English painter
 Samuel Palmer (1805–1881) – English landscape painter, etcher and printmaker
 William Dyce (1806–1864) – Scottish artist
 Arthur Elliot (1809–1892) – British watercolourist
 Thomas Mogford (1809–1868) – English portrait painter and landscape painter
 James John Hill (1811–1882) – English painter
 Edmund John Niemann (1813–1876) – English painter
 Lucette Barker (1816–1905) – English painter
 William James Blacklock (1816–1858) – English landscape artist, painting scenery in Cumbria, the Lake District and the Scottish Borders
 Edward Armitage (1817–1896) – English Victorian era painter especially of historical, classical and biblical subjects
 Richard Dadd (1817–1886) – English painter especially of fairies and other supernatural subjects, Orientalist scenes, and enigmatic genre scenes
 Walter Hood Fitch (1817–1892) – Scottish botanist and botanical artist
 Alfred Tippinge (1817–1898) – British Grenadier Guard who sent home paintings of the Crimean War
 George Frederic Watts (1817–1904) – English Victorian painter and sculptor of the Symbolist movement
 Branwell Brontë (1817–1848) – English portrait painter; one of the Brontë children, brother of Anne, Emily and Charlotte; occasional poet and writer
 William Hemsley (1819–1906) – English genre painter; vice president of the Society of British Artists
 William Powell Frith (1819–1909) – English painter specialising in portraits and Victorian era narratives
 George Gammon Adams (1821–1898)- English sculptor and medallist
 Ford Madox Brown (1821–1893) – English painter of moral and historical subjects
 Lefevre James Cranstone (1822–1893) – English painter, known for paintings of antebellum America
 Frances Emilia Crofton (1822–1910) – Anglo-Irish artist
 Frederick Goodall (snr) (1822–1904) – English artist specialising in oriental scenes
 Frederick William Keyl (1823–1871) – German-born British painter of animals
 Charles Davidson (1824–1902) – English watercolour painter
 Henry Alexander Bowler (1824–1903) – English painter and academic
 Abraham Solomon (1824–1862) – English painter
 Thomas Woolner (1825–1892) – English sculptor and poet
 Barbara Bodichon (1827–1891) – English educationalist and landscape artist
 William Holman Hunt (1827–1910) – British painter, founder of the Pre-Raphaelite Brotherhood
 Robert Taylor Pritchett (1828–1907) – English watercolour artist and illustrator
 Dante Gabriel Rossetti (1828–1882) – English poet, illustrator, painter and translator
 Anna Blunden (1829–1915) – English painter 
 James Docharty (1829–1878) – Scottish landscape painter
 Edwin Long (1829–1890) – English orientalist painter, depicting Biblical and Middle Eastern subjects
 John Everett Millais (1829–1896) – English painter and illustrator and one of the founders of the Pre-Raphaelite Brotherhood
 John Henry Dell (1830–1888) – English painter and illustrator
 Alfred William Hunt (1830–1896) – English painter
 Frederic Leighton (1830–1896) – English painter and sculptor especially of historical, biblical and classical subject matter
 Charles James Lewis (1830–1892) – English painter in oils and watercolours
 Marianne North (1830–1890) – English naturalist and flower painter
 Walter Severn (1830–1904) – English watercolourist
 John William Bailey (1831–1914) – British miniature painter
 Benjamin Williams Leader (1831–1923) – English painter
 Louise Rayner (1832–1924) – English watercolourist
 Arthur Hughes (1832–1915) – English painter and illustrator associated with the Pre-Raphaelite Brotherhood
 William Quiller Orchardson (1832–1910) – Scottish portraitist and painter of domestic and historical subjects
 Daniel Charles Grose (1832–1900) – English painter
 Edward Burne-Jones (1833–1898) – English artist and designer
 Joseph Clark  (1834–1926), English oil painter of domestic scenes 
 William Morris (1834–1896) – English artist, writer, and socialist
 James McNeill Whistler (1834–1903) – American-born, British-based painter and etcher
 Wyke Bayliss (1835–1906) – English painter of churches and cathedrals
 William McTaggart (1835–1910) – Scottish landscape painter
 Arthur Boyd Houghton (1836–1875) – British painter (oil and watercolours) and illustrator
 John Atkinson Grimshaw (1836–1893) – English painter especially of landscapes
 Lawrence Alma-Tadema (1836–1912) – British classical-subject painter
 James Tissot (1836–1902) – French-born painter of portraits as well as genre subjects
 Simeon Solomon (1840–1905) – English Pre-Raphaelite painter
 Frederick Walker (1840–1875) – English Social Realist painter and illustrator in watercolours and oils
 Albert Moore (1841–1893) – English painter especially of languorous female figures set against the luxury and decadence of the classical world
 Alexander Rossi (1841–1916) – British artist specializing in genre works
 Thomas Bush Hardy (1842–1897) – British marine painter and watercolourist
 William John Seward Webber (1842–1919), English sculptor
 Lucy Madox Brown (1843–1894) – English painter and watercolourist
 Walter Crane (1845–1915) – English artist and book illustrator
 Frank Holl (1845–1888) – English painter
 Walter Greaves (1846–1930) – English painter
 James Campbell Noble (1846–1913) – Scottish landscape, seascape and portrait painter
 John Eyre (1847–1927) –  English genre painter, illustrator,  painted and designed pottery 
 Ralph Hedley (1848–1913) – English realist painter, woodcarver and illustrator
 John William Waterhouse (1849–1917) – English Pre-Raphaelite painter especially of female characters from mythology and literature
 John Collier (1850–1934) – British writer and painter in the Pre-Raphaelite style
 Robert Weir Allan (1851–1942) – Glasgow born painter of landscape and marine subjects
 John Charles Dollman (1851–1934) – English narrative, landscape and animal painter
 Edward Robert Hughes (1851–1914) – English painter in a Pre-Raphaelitism and Aestheticism style
 Edmund Leighton (1853–1922) – English painter in Pre-Raphaelite and Romantic styles
 Frank Dicksee (1853–1928) – English Victorian painter and illustrator especially of dramatic historical and legendary scenes
 Maude Goodman (1853–1938) (a.k.a. Matilda Scanes) – English Victorian fine art painter and children’s book illustrator, Romantic genre paintings
 Caroline Gotch (1854–1945) – English painter associated with the Newlyn School of artists
 Walter Dendy Sadler (1854–1923) – English painter
 Alfred Wallis (1855–1942) – Cornish fisherman and artist
 David Winder (1855–1933) – Bolton, Lancashire-born British artist; oil and watercolour
 James Pittendreigh MacGillivray (1856–1938) – Scottish sculptor
 Alfred William Rich (1856–1921) – English landscape artist
 John Singer Sargent (1856–1925) – Expatriate American living in England; leading portrait painter of his era, landscape painter and watercolorist
 Richard Caton Woodville (1856–1927) – English artist, and illustrator especially of battle scenes
 Joseph Benwell Clark (1857–1938) –  English landscape painter and book illustrator 
 Stanhope Forbes (1857–1947) – British artist, founder of the Newlyn School
 Arthur Hacker (1858–1919) – English classicist painter
 Henry Scott Tuke (1858–1929) – English painter who lived in Cornwall, best known for his maritime paintings and male nudes
 Walter Sickert (1860–1942) – English Impressionist painter
 Solomon Joseph Solomon (1860–1927) – English painter of mythological scenes and portraits
 Philip Wilson Steer (1860–1942) – English artist
 Harriet Isabel Adams (1863–1952) – British artist and illustrator
 Lily Delissa Joseph (1863–1940) – English painter
 Charles Edgar Buckeridge (1864–1898) – church decorative artist
 Archibald Standish Hartrick (1864–1950) – Scottish painter
 Arthur Wardle (1864–1949) – English painter
 William Edwin Pimm (1864–1952) – British artist, oil and watercolours
 Thomas Edwin Mostyn (1864–1930) – English painter
 Arthur Lowe (painter) (1865–1940) – English landscape artist from Kinoulton, Nottingham
 Robert Bevan (1865–1925) – British painter
 H. Gustave Hiller (1865–1946) – mainly of stained glass
 Roger Fry (1866–1934) – English artist and art critic
 Henry Charles Fehr (1867–1940) – English sculptor
 Mabel Lee Hankey (1867–1943) – English artist, mainly of miniature portraits painted in watercolour on ivory
 Frank Brangwyn (1867–1956) – Welsh artist, painter, water colourist, virtuoso engraver and illustrator, and progressive designer
 J M Balliol Salmon (1868–1953) – British painter
 Charles Murray Padday (1868–1954) – English painter
 Ursula Wood (1868–1925) – English painter
 Lamorna Birch (1869–1955) – English painter
 Lucy Kemp-Welch (1869–1958) – English equine artist
 Henry Crocket (1870–1926) – landscape painter
 William Ratcliffe (1870–1955) – English artist 
 Phelan Gibb (1870–1948) – British artist and early modernist, painting in Paris 1910–1914
 Sholto Johnstone Douglas (1871–1958) – Scottish artist
 Florence Engelbach (1872–1951) – English painter born in Spain
 Alfred Garth Jones (1872–1955) – English artist and illustrator
 William Nicholson (1872–1949) – English painter, illustrator and author of children's books
 Aubrey Beardsley (1872–1898) – English illustrator and author especially of erotic illustrations
 Eleanor Fortescue-Brickdale (1872–1945) – English artist and illustrator
 Louie Burrell (1873–1971) – English painter
 Francis William Doyle Jones (1873–1938) – English sculptor
 Isabel Codrington (1874–1943) – English painter
 John Duncan Fergusson (1874–1961) – Scottish artist, one of the Scottish Colourists school of painting
 Hilda May Gordon (1874–1972) – British watercolourist
 Frank O. Salisbury (1874–1962) – English painter known for his portraits and historical and mythological works
 Dorothea Sharp (1874–1955) – British landscape painter
 Eleanor Best (1875–1957) – portrait and figure painter
 Evelyn Cheston (1875–1929) – English landscape painter
 Alice Kirkby Goyder (1875–1964) – English painter and etcher
 Arthur Henry Knighton-Hammond (1875–1970) – English painter best known for landscapes, society portraits, and industrial paintings
 Henry Bates Joel (1875–1922) – English landscape painter
 Margaret Fisher Prout (1875–1963) – English painter
 Walter Dexter (1876–1958) – English oil and watercolour artist, particularly of Norfolk
 Harold Gilman (1876–1919) – English artist and founder-member of the Camden Town Group
 Gwen John (1876–1939) – Welsh artist
 Horace Tuck (1876–1951) – Norfolk artist of oil and watercolour landscapes
 Florence Mabel Hollams (1877–1963) – painter of dogs and horses
 Laura Knight (1877–1970) – British artist
 Frank Cadogan Cowper (1877–1958) – English artist
 Donald Maxwell (1877–1936) – English illustrator and painter in oils and watercolours
 Hilda Annetta Walker (1877–1960) – English sculptor and painter
 Denis Eden (1878–1949) – painter and illustrator
 Charles Ginner (1878–1952) – French-born painter, member of Camden Town Group
 Spencer Gore (1878–1914) – British painter who was first president of the Camden Town Group
 Augustus John (1878–1961) – Welsh painter, draughtsman, and etcher
 Louis Frederick Roslyn (1878–1940) – English sculptor
 Sir Alfred James Munnings KCVO, PRA (1878–1959) – English artist, particularly renowned for equine subject matter
 Ada Hill Walker (1879–1955) – scientific illustrator and artist
 William Reid Dick (1879–1961) – Scottish sculptor
 Vanessa Bell (1879–1961) – English painter and interior designer
 Gertrude Harvey (1879–1966) – English landscape painter
 Matthew Smith (1879–1959) – English painter
 Malcolm Drummond (1880–1945) – English artist, noted for his paintings of urban scenes and interiors
 Jacob Epstein (1880–1959) – American-born sculptor who worked chiefly in the UK, where he pioneered modern sculpture
 Elsie Henderson (1880–1967) – English painter and sculptor
 Harry Morley (1881–1943) – English painter
 Eric Gill (1882–1940) – British sculptor, typeface designer, stonecutter and printmaker
 Percy Wyndham Lewis (1882–1957) – English painter and author
 Henry Lamb (1883–1960) – Australian-born British painter
 Victoria Monkhouse (1883–1970) – English painter
 Arthur Watts (1883–1935) – illustrator
 Elinor Proby Adams (1885–1945) – English painter
 Duncan Grant (1885–1978) – Scottish painter and member of the Bloomsbury Group
 Gwen Raverat (1885–1957) – English wood engraving artist who co-founded the Society of Wood Engravers
 Randolph Schwabe (1885–1948) – English artist
 Joseph Hermon Cawthra (1886–1971) – English sculptor
 Maxwell Gordon Lightfoot (1886–1911) – English painter
 Austin Osman Spare (1886–1956) – English artist and occultist
 L. S. Lowry (1887–1976) – English artist
 Elizabeth Polunin (1887–1950) – English artist and theatre designer
 Arthur James F. Bond (1888–1958) – English painter of maritime subjects
 Sydney Carline (1888–1929) – English artist
 David Dougal Williams (June 1888–28 September 1944) – British artist and art teacher
 Margaret Lindsay Williams (1888–1960) – Welsh portrait painter
 Edith Grace Wheatley (1888–1970) – English painter
 Robert Gibbings (1889–1958) – Irish artist and author known especially as a wood engraver and for books on travel and natural history
 Paul Nash (1889–1946) – English war artist
 Christopher Nevinson (1889–1946) – English painter and vorticist
 Ruth Simpson (1889–1964) – English portrait painter
 Edward Wadsworth (1889–1949) – English artist
 David Bomberg (1890–1957) – English painter and one of the Whitechapel Boys
 Charles Cundall (1890–1971) – English painter
 Joseph Gray (1890–1963) – English painter
 Nina Hamnett (1890–1956) – Welsh artist and writer
 Francis Helps (1890–1972) – English artist
 Edmond Xavier Kapp (1890–1978) – English artist
 Iain Macnab (1890–1967) – Scottish painter
 Olive Mudie-Cooke (1890–1925) – English painter
 Leon Underwood (1890–1975) – British sculptor, painter, and engraver
 Henri Gaudier-Brzeska (1891–1915) – French sculptor and vorticist
 Mark Gertler (1891–1939) – British portrait and landscape painter
 Stanley Spencer (1891–1959) – English painter
 Arthur Ralph Middleton Todd (1891–1966) – English portrait painter
 Elsa Fraenkel (1892–1975) – German born British sculptor
 Colin Gill (1892–1940) – English painter
 Gilbert Spencer (1892–1978) – British painter
 Harold Sandys Williamson (1892–1978) – British painter
 John Armstrong (1893–1973) – British artist 
 John Nash (1893–1977) – English painter, illustrator, and engraver
 Winifred Nicholson (1893–1981) – English painter
 Orovida Camille Pissarro (1893–1968) – English painter and etcher
 Leonard Squirrell (1893–1979) – English watercolourist and etcher
 Henry Matthew Talintyre (1893–1962) – British artist
 Flora Twort (1893–1985) – English painter who specialised in watercolours and pastels
 Henry Carr (1894–1970) – British painter
 Meredith Frampton (1894–1984) – British artist
 Alethea Garstin (1894–1978) – Cornish painter
 Ben Nicholson (1894–1982) – English abstract painter
 Dora Clarke (1895–1989) – English sculptor
 David Jones (1895–1974) – Welsh artist and British modernist poet
 William Roberts (1895–1980) – English painter and war artist
 Raymond Coxon (1896–1997) – British artist 
 Leila Faithfull (1896–1994) – British artist
 Harry Barr (1896-1987) – English painter
 John Buckland Wright (1897–1954) – New Zealand born illustrator 
 Harold Williamson (1898–1972) – British painter, designer, etcher and teacher
 Henry Moore (1898–1986) – English artist and sculptor
 Rodney Joseph Burn (1899–1984) – English artist
 Winifred Knights (1899–1947) – English painter

Born 1900–1949 
 Joseph Mellor Hanson (1900–1963)
 Ursula Edgcumbe (1900–1985) 
 Barbara Greg (1900–1983)
 George Lambourn (1900–1977)
 Roland Penrose (1900–1984)
 Harold Tamblyn-Watts (1900–1999)
 Gertrude Hermes (1901–1983)
 Elsie Dalton Hewland (1901–1979)
 Ancell Stronach (1901–1981) – Professor of Mural Painting at the Glasgow School of Art
 Fred Whicker (1901–1966)
 Christopher Wood (1901–1930)
 Marjorie Frances Bruford (1902–1958)
 Jean Clark (1902–1999)
 Frank Barrington Craig (1902–1951)
 Aileen Eagleton (1902–1984)
 Simon Elwes (1902–1975)
 Robin Guthrie (1902–1971)
 Barbara Hepworth (1903–1975)
 Ray Howard-Jones (1903–1996)
 Charles Mahoney (1903–1968)
 John Piper (1903–1992)
 Eric Ravilious (1903–1942)
 Richard Eurich (1903–1992)
 Ceri Richards (1903–1971)
 Albert Houthuesen (1903–1979)
 Graham Sutherland (1903–1980)
 Mary Adshead (1904–1995)
 Peggy Angus (1904–1993) 
 Celia Frances Bedford (1904–1959)
 Helen Binyon (1904–1979)
 Stephen Bone (1904–1958)
 Evan Charlton (1904–1984)
 Griselda Allan (1905–1987)
 Reg Bunn (1905–1971)
 Edward Burra (1905–1976)
 Kathleen Guthrie (1905–1981)
 Eliot Hodgkin (1905–1987)
 Morris Kestelman (1905–1998)
 Kenneth Martin (1905–1984)
 Robert Medley (1905–1994)
 Vernon Ward (1905–1985)
 Rex Whistler (1905–1944)
 Kathleen Allen (1906–1983)
 Evelyn Dunbar (1906–1960)
 Patrick Hall (1906–1992)
 Joan Hassall (1906–1988)
 Edgar Hubert (1906–1985)
 Kenneth Steel (1906–1970)
 Reginald Ben Davis (1907–1998)
 Phyllis Ginger (1907–2005)
 James McIntosh Patrick (1907–1998) – Scottish landscape painter
 Brenda Landon, later Brenda Pye (1907–2005)
 Claude Rogers (1907–1979)
 William Coldstream (1908–1987)
 Isobel Heath (1908–1989)
 Norman Hepple (1908–1994)
 Victor Pasmore (1908–1998)
 Stella Schmolle (1908–1975)
 Carel Weight (1908–1997)
 Francis Bacon (1909–1992) – born in Ireland
 Dorothea Braby (1909–1987) 
 Thomas Carr (1909–1999)
 Leonard Daniels (1909–1998)
 Paul Lucien Dessau (1909–1999)
 Harold Frank Hoar (1909–1976)
 Gwynneth Holt (1909–1995) – ivory sculptor
 Leslie Hurry (1909–1978)
 Eric Taylor (1909–1999)
 Geoffrey Tibble (1909–1952)
Isabel Alexander (1910–1996)
 Pamela Drew (1910–1989)
 Bernard Hailstone (1910–1987)
 Rodrigo Moynihan (1910–1990)
 Rosemary Allan (1911–2008)
 Phyllis Bray (1911–1991)
 John Kingsley Cook (1911–1994)
 Anthony Devas (1911–1958)
 Roger Hilton (1911–1975)
 Nicolette Macnamara (1911–1987)
 Gwen Barnard (1912–1988)
 Andrew Freeth (1912–1986)
 Erlund Hudson (1912–2011)
 Georgina Hunt (1912–2012)
 Keith Vaughan (1912–1977)
 Reg Butler (1913–1981)
 Raymond Teague Cowern (1913–1986)
 Joan Hutt (1913–1985)
 Leonard Rosoman (1913–2012)
 Lynn Chadwick (1914–2003)
 Harold Hitchcock (1914–2009)
 Frances Macdonald (1914–2002)
 Charles Mozley (1914–1991)
 Frank Roper (1914–2000) – sculptor
 Doris Blair (born 1915)
 Mary Fedden (1915-2012)
 Dennis Flanders (1915–1994)
 Wendy F. Walsh (1915–2014) – illustrator and botanical artist
 Norman Whitehead (1915–1983)
 Eileen Aldridge (1916–1990)
 John Bridgeman (1916–2004)
Margaret Thomas (1916–2016) – painter
 James Lawrence Isherwood (1917–1989)
 John Kashdan (1917–2001)
 Anthony Robert Klitz (1917–2000)
 John Minton (1917–1957)
 Mona Moore (1917–2000)
 Estella Campavias (1918–1990)
 John Kyffin Williams (1918–2006)
 Peter Lanyon (1918–1964)
 Richard Vicary (1918–2006) – printmaker
 Eden Box (1918–1988)
 Mary Audsley (1919–2008)
 Norman Cornish (1919–2014)
 Colin Hayes (1919–2003)
 Cliff Holden (1919–2020)
 Peter Wright (1919–2003)
 Michael Ford (1920–2005)
 Patrick Heron (1920–1999)
 Robert Tavener (1920–2004)
 Françoise Taylor (1920–2007) – born in Belgium, British by marriage
 Derek Chittock (1922–1986)
 Lucian Freud (1922–2011)
 Richard Hamilton (1922–2011)
 Eduardo Paolozzi (1922–2005)
 Miles Richmond (1922–2008)
 Pamela Ascherson (1923–2010)
 William McLaren (1923–1987)
 Anthony Caro (1924–2013)
 Anthony Earnshaw (1924–2001)
 Erich von Götha de la Rosière (born 1924)
 Keith Sutton (1924–1991)
 Beryl Cook (1926–2008)
 Ian Hamilton Finlay (1925–2006)
 Michael Edmonds (1926–2014)
 Leon Kossoff (1926–2019)
 Edna Mann (1926–1985)
 Tom McGuinness (1926–2006)
 Patrick Swift (1927–1983) – born in Ireland
 Greta Tomlinson (1927–2021)
 Michael Andrews (1928–1995)
 John Copnall (1928–2007)
 Dora Holzhandler (1928–2015) – born in Paris to Polish parents but lived in London
 Elizabeth Jane Lloyd (1928–1995)
 Dorothy Mead (1928–1975)
 Joe Tilson (born 1928)
 John Scanes (1928–2004)
 Victor Willing (1928–1988)
 Barbara Balmer (1929–2017)
 Zelda Nolte (1929–2003)
 Mardi Barrie (1930–2004)
 Robyn Denny (1930–2014)
 David Gentleman (born 1930)
 Donald Pass (1930–2010)
 Frank Auerbach (born 1931)
 Dennis Creffield (1931–2018)
 Ken Messer (1931–2018)
 Malcolm Morley (1931–2018) – first winner of the Turner Prize in 1984
 Bridget Riley (born 1931)
 Valerie Thornton (1931–1991)
 Audrey Barker (1932–2002)
 Peter Blake (born 1932)
 Howard Hodgkin (1932–2017)
 Norman Douglas Hutchinson (1932–2010) – royal painter
 Ken Howard (born 1932)
 R. B. Kitaj (1932–2007) – born in the United States
 Euan Uglow (1932–2000)
 Marc Vaux (born 1932)
 Ian Weatherhead (born 1932)
 Richard Allen (1933–1999)
 John Furnival (1933–2020) – artist of visual and concrete poetry
 Vincent Haddelsey (1934–2010)
 John Hoyland (1934–2011)
 Jeremy Moon (1934–1973)
 Garth Evans (born 1934) – sculptor
 Rose Wylie (born 1934) – painter
 Paula Rego (born 1935) – born in Portugal
 Frank Bowling (born 1936)
 Tony Foster (born 1936) – painter
 Patrick Caulfield (1936–2005)
 David Hall (1937–2014)
 David Hockney (born 1937)
 Allen Jones (born 1937)
 Tom Phillips (born 1937)
 Pamela Scott Wilkie (born 1937)
 Margot Perryman (born 1938)
 Carole Steyn (born 1938)
 William Tillyer (born 1938)
 Terry Atkinson (born 1939)
 Rose Frain (born 1939)
 Anthony Green (born 1939)
 Patrick Hughes (born 1939)
 Ian Hunter (1939–2017) – Dean of Saint Martin's School of Art
 John Walker (born 1939) – painter and printmaker
 John Byrne (born 1940)
 Peter Liddle (born 1940)
 Barry Flanagan (1941–2009)
 Yvonne Hutton (1941–1991)
 Geoffrey Key (born 1941)
 Robert Lenkiewicz (1941–2002)
 Ruth Rix (born 1942)
 Alan Aldridge (1938–2017)
 Grange Calveley (born 1943)
 Errol Lloyd (born 1943)
 Osi Rhys Osmond (1943–2015)
 Graham Ovenden (born 1943)
 Valerie Wiffen (born 1943)
 Zacron (1943–2012) – multimedia artist, writer, broadcaster
 Lindsay Bartholomew (born 1944)
 Bruce McLean (born 1944)
 David Paskett (born 1944)
 Ali Omar Ermes (born 1945)
 Maggi Hambling (born 1945)
 Ed Herring (1945–2003)
 Pete Hoida (born 1944)
 Geoffrey Humphries (born 1945)
 David Imms (born 1945)
 Richard Long (born 1945)
 Val Archer (born 1946)
 Lewis Blake (born 1946)
 Terance James Bond (born 1946)
 Paul Dash (born 1946)
 Rose Garrard (born 1946)
 Winston Branch (born 1947)
 Shelagh Cluett (1947–2007) – sculptor
 Richard Cook (born 1947)
 Tam Joseph (born 1947)
 Vikki Slowe (born 1947) – printmaker and painter
 Linda Sutton (born 1947)
 Godfrey Blow (born 1948)
 Pete Gilbert (born 1948) – graphic designer and painter
 Richard Deacon (born 1949) – 1987 Turner Prize Winner
 Paul Wager (born 1949) – painter and sculptor

Born 1950 and later

 Sam Ainsley (born 1950)
 Alison Dunhill (born 1950)
 Antony Gormley (born 1950)
 Edward Allington (1951–2017)
 Humphrey Ocean (born 1951)
 Richard Spare (born 1951)
 Jeremy Henderson (1952–2009) – artist and painter
 Colin Nichols (born 1952)
 Tim Woolcock (born 1952) – Modern British painter painting in the tradition of the 1950s
 Stephen Pusey (born 1952)
 Alan Rankle (born 1952) – landscape painter
 Jane Boyd (born 1953)
 Pogus Caesar (born 1953) – born in St Kitts
 Chris Gollon (1953–2017)
 Ingrid Pollard (born 1953)
 Melinda Camber Porter (1953–2008) – painter, writer, filmmaker, journalist for The Times; lived in London, Paris, and New York
 Charles Thomson (born 1953)
 Martin Yeoman (born 1953)
 Michael Clark (artist) (born 1954)
 Lubaina Himid (born 1954)
 Aidan Hughes (born 1954)
 Anish Kapoor (born 1954)
 Vivien Blackett (born 1955)
 David Tress (born 1955)
 Denzil Forrester (born 1956)
 Errol Francis (born 1956)
 Terry Smith (born 1956)
 James Dodds (born 1957)
 Jeremy Gardiner (born 1957)
 Fiona Graham-Mackay (born 1957) – portraits of the royal family
 Thomas Hodges (born 1957) – photographic and mixed media artist
 Panayiotis Kalorkoti (born 1957)
 Willard Wigan (born 1957)
 Simon Beck (artist) (born 1958) – snow artist
 Sokari Douglas Camp (born 1958)
 Keith Coventry (born 1958)
 Lennie Lee (born 1958) – born in South Africa
 Jake Tilson (born 1958)
 Andy Dog Johnson (1959–2016)
 Claudette Johnson (born 1959)
 Hew Locke (born 1959) – born in Scotland
 Bruce Munro (born 1959)
 Keith Salmon (born 1959) – Scottish landscape painter born in England
 Suzzan Blac (born 1960)
 Eddie Chambers (born 1960)
 John Foulger (1960–2006)
 Isaac Julien (born 1960)
 Grayson Perry (born 1960)
 Nick Fudge (born 1960)
 Keith Piper (born 1960)
 Yinka Shonibare (born 1960)
 Julie Brook (born 1961)
 Sonia Boyce (born 1962)
 Jonathan S Hooper (born 1962)
 Marion Kalmus (born 1962)
 Sarah Lucas (born 1962)
 Paul Mellia (born 1962)
 Nick Miller (born 1962) – Irish painter born in England
 Janette Parris (born 1962)
 Nasser Azam (born 1963)
 Nicola Bealing (born 1963)
 Tracey Emin (born 1963)
 Robert Fogell (born 1963)
 Janette Parris (born 1963)
 Dean Stalham (born c. 1963)
 Barbara Walker (born 1963)
 Gillian Wearing  (born 1963) – 1997 Turner Prize winner
 Rachel Whiteread (born 1963) – 1993 Turner Prize winner
 Frances Aviva Blane (born 1964)
 Jonathan Ellery (born 1964)
 Simon Gales (born 1964)
 Hipkiss (born 1964)
 Rachel Ara (born 1965)
 Tom Cartmill (born 1965)
 Adam Chodzko (born 1965)
 Marion Coutts (born 1965)
 Guy Denning (born 1965)
 Damien Hirst (born 1965)
 Jonathan Huxley (born 1965)
 Robert Priseman (born 1965)
 Fiona Banner (born 1966)
 Fiona Crisp (born 1966) – photographer
 Ian Davenport (born 1966)
 Juno Doran (born 1966)
 Christian Furr (born 1966)
 Igor Kufayev (born 1966)
 Maria Marshall (born 1966)
 Elizabeth Price (born 1966) – 2012 Turner Prize winner
 Peter Brown (born 1967)
 Serena de la Hey (born 1967), sculptor
 Andy Lomas (born 1967)
 Virginia Nimarkoh (born 1967)
 Paul Rooney (born 1967)
 Chris Ofili (born 1968)
 Suling Wang (born 1968)
 Brita Granström (born 1969)
 Chantal Joffe (born 1969)
 Jonathan Myles-Lea (1969–2021) – painter of country houses, historic buildings, and landscapes
 Michael Gustavius Payne (born 1969)
 Alexander Talbot Rice (born 1969) – society portrait painter
 Justin Mortimer (born 1970)
 Nina Murdoch (born 1970) – tempera painter
 Mandy Wilkinson (born 1970)
 Jonathan Kearney (born 1971)
 David Emmanuel Noel (born 1972)
 Anna Barriball (born 1972) – mixed media artist
 Dee Ferris (born 1973)
 Peter Liversidge (born 1973)
 Malcolm McGookin (born 1956)
 Banksy (born 1974)
 Tom Palin (born 1974)
 Stephen Wiltshire (born 1974) – savant artist
 Graham Nicholls (born 1975)
 Lucy Skaer (born 1975)
 Amanda Ansell (born 1976)
 Reuben Colley (born 1976)
 Adelaide Damoah (born c. 1977)
 Maryam Hashemi (born 1977)
 Conrad Shawcross (born 1977)
 Lynette Yiadom-Boakye (born 1977) 
 Claire Hooper (born 1978)
 David Spriggs (born 1978) – sculptor, installation artist
 Angela Wakefield (born 1978)
 Hannah Rickards (born 1979)
 Fuller (born 1980)
 Nick Gentry (born 1980)
 Conor Harrington (born 1980)
 Edward Kluz (born 1980)
 Polly Morgan (born 1980)
 Stuart Semple (born 1980)
 Chris (Simpsons artist) (born 1983)
 Anna King (born 1984)
 Anthony Smith (born 1984) – bronze sculptor
 Sarah Maple (born 1985) – feminist artist, first New Sensations winner
 Emma Cousin (born 1986)
 Johan Andersson (born 1986)
 Nicola Frimpong (born 1987)
 Seb Toussaint (born 1988) - street artist and painter
 Nathan Wyburn (born 1989) – food artist
 Sophie Green (born 1992)

See also
 List of Manx artists
 List of artists from Northern Ireland
 List of Scottish artists
 List of Welsh artists

References

 
Artists